The Zimbabwean cricket team in Bangladesh in 2006–07 played a Twenty20 International match and five One Day International matches. The T20I was the inaugural T20I played by both teams which Bangladesh won by 43 runs and they also whitewashed Zimbabwe in the limited formats by 5-0 margin.

Squads

Tour match

Only T20I
 {{Limited overs international
  | date = 28 November 2006
  | team1 =  
  | score1 = 166 (19.5 overs) 
  | score2 = 123/9 (20 overs) 
  | team2 = 
  | runs1 = Mashrafe Mortaza 36 (26)
  | wickets1 = Prosper Utseya 3/25 (4 overs)
  | runs2 = Sean Williams 38 (42)
  | wickets2 = Abdur Razzak 3/17 (4 overs)
  | result =  won by 43 runs
  | report = (Scorecard)
  | venue = Khulna Divisional Stadium, Khulna, Bangladesh
  | umpires = Enamul Haque (Ban) and Nadir Shah (Ban)
  | motm = Mashrafe Mortaza (BAN)
  | rain = 
  | toss = Zimbabwe won the toss and elected to field.
  | notes = This was Bangladesh and Zimbabwe's both inaugural T20I match.
Nazmus Sadat, Shahriar Nafees, Aftab Ahmed, Shakib Al Hasan, Nadif Chowdhury, Farhad Reza, Mushfiqur Rahim, Mashrafe Mortaza, Mohammad Rafique, Abdur Razzak, Shahadat Hossain (Ban), Brendan Taylor, Stuart Matsikenyeri, Elton Chigumbura, Hamilton Masakadza, Sean Williams, Keith Dabengwa, Mluleki Nkala, Gary Brent, Prosper Utseya, Chamu Chibhabha, Anthony Ireland (Zim) all made their T20Is debuts.
}}

ODI series
1st ODI
 

2nd ODI
 

3rd ODI
 

4th ODI
 

5th ODI
 

References

 Wisden Cricketers Almanack''

External links
 CricketArchive tour itinerary

2006 in Bangladeshi cricket
International cricket competitions in 2006–07
2006-07
Bangladeshi cricket seasons from 2000–01
2006 in Zimbabwean cricket